Näsuvere is a village in Türi Parish, Järva County in central Estonia.

References

Villages in Järva County